Humboldt was a federal electoral district in Canada, that was represented in the House of Commons of Canada from 1904 to 1953. When it was created in 1903, it was part of the Northwest Territories. When Saskatchewan became a province in 1905, Humboldt riding was in that province. It was abolished in 1952 when it was redistributed into Humboldt—Melfort, Mackenzie and Rosthern ridings.

Members of Parliament 

This riding elected the following Members of Parliament:

A.J. Adamson, Liberal (1904–1908)
David Bradley Neely, Liberal (1908–1917)
Norman Lang, Unionist (1917–1921)
Charles Wallace Stewart, Progressive (1921–1925)
Albert Frederick Totzke, Liberal (1925–1935)
Harry Raymond Fleming, Liberal (1935–1942)
Joseph William Burton, Co-operative Commonwealth Federation (1943–1949)
Joseph Ingolph Hetland, Liberal (1949–1953)

Election results

By-election: On Mr. Fleming's death, 5 November 1942

See also 

 List of Canadian federal electoral districts
 Past Canadian electoral districts

External links 
 
 

Former federal electoral districts of Saskatchewan
Former federal electoral districts of Northwest Territories